Danny Garcia is an American Christian peace activist, former military chaplain, and founder of Global Walk, who walked around the planet from 1996-2020. His efforts earned him the nickname "Walking Man."         

In 1998, San Diego mayor Susan Golding named January 25, 1998 "Danny Garcia Day" in his honor.

References

External links
Global Walk official website 

American anti-war activists
20th-century American people
Living people
Place of birth missing (living people)
Year of birth missing (living people)